Seán Ó Fearghaíl (born 17 April 1960) is an Irish Fianna Fáil politician who has served as the Ceann Comhairle of Dáil Éireann since March 2016. He has been a Teachta Dála (TD) for the Kildare South constituency since 2002. He was a Senator for the Agricultural Panel from 2000 to 2002.

Life and career
Ó Fearghaíl comes from a farming background, and previously worked for Dublin Corporation. He was elected as a member of Kildare County Council in 1985. He first stood for election to Dáil Éireann in the Kildare constituency at the 1987 general election, but was unsuccessful. He was unsuccessful again at the 1989 general election.

After further defeats at the 1992 and 1997 general elections, he stood for Seanad Éireann in 1997, as a candidate before the Agricultural Panel, but he was again unsuccessful in seeking election. He won a seat in the 21st Seanad following a by-election held in June 2000, after the death of Senator Patrick McGowan.

Ó Fearghaíl won a Dáil seat on his fifth attempt following the 2002 general election, when he defeated the sitting Fine Gael TD Alan Dukes. At the 2007 general election, he topped the poll and was elected on the first count. He was re-elected at the 2011 general election and at the 2016 general election.

He was the Fianna Fáil party whip and Spokesperson on Foreign Affairs and Trade from April 2011 to July 2012. In July 2012, he was appointed as Spokesperson on Constitutional Reform, Arts and Culture, and Defence, while retaining the post of party whip. Ó Fearghaíl sent Éamon Ó Cuív a letter gagging him during the European Fiscal Compact referendum campaign, after Ó Cuív expressed his own opinion of the Compact against the party's wishes.

He was elected as Ceann Comhairle of Dáil Éireann, by its members, at the first sitting of the 32nd Dáil on 10 March 2016. This was the first time the position was filled by secret ballot. He was re-elected to the position at the first sitting of the 33rd Dáil on 20 February 2020.

On 22 November 2021, Ó Fearghaíl began self-isolating and working from home after testing positive for COVID-19. Leas-Cheann Comhairle Catherine Connolly took over his duties.

Support for the People's Republic of China
In his role as Ceann Comhairle, Ó Fearghaíl has been a vocal supporter of Chinese Government policy and increasing ties between Ireland and China.  In 2018, he warned Teachtaí Dála and Senators that contact with Taiwan would "offend the Chinese government", and could damage Ireland’s business and diplomatic relationship with China. Accusations of lobbying the Irish Government and political parties on behalf of the Chinese government were leveled by members of the Oireachtas in November 2020. Ó Fearghaíl has also praised China's human rights record and economic policies.

References

External links

 

1960 births
Living people
Fianna Fáil TDs
Irish farmers
Local councillors in County Kildare
Members of the 21st Seanad
Members of the 29th Dáil
Members of the 30th Dáil
Members of the 31st Dáil
Members of the 32nd Dáil
Politicians from County Kildare
Presiding officers of Dáil Éireann
Fianna Fáil senators
Members of the 33rd Dáil